The 1950 Chicago White Sox season was the team's 50th season in the major leagues, and its 51st season overall. They finished with a record of 60–94, good enough for sixth place in the American League, 38 games behind the first place New York Yankees.

Offseason 
 October 1949: Chico Carrasquel was purchased by the White Sox from the Brooklyn Dodgers.
 February 28, 1950: Catfish Metkovich was purchased from the White Sox by the Oakland Oaks.
 Prior to 1950 season (exact date unknown)
 Bill Wilson was acquired by the White Sox from the Sacramento Solons as part of a minor league working agreement.
 Vito Valentinetti was signed as an amateur free agent by the White Sox.

Regular season

Season standings

Record vs. opponents

Opening Day lineup 
 Herb Adams, RF
 Dave Philley, CF
 Cass Michaels, 2B
 Gus Zernial, LF
 Hank Majeski, 3B
 Chuck Kress, 1B
 Chico Carrasquel, SS
 Phil Masi, C
 Bill Wight, P

Notable transactions 
 July 1, 1950: Jack Bruner was purchased from the White Sox by the St. Louis Browns.

Roster

Player stats

Batting 
Note: G = Games played; AB = At bats; R = Runs scored; H = Hits; 2B = Doubles; 3B = Triples; HR = Home runs; RBI = Runs batted in; BB = Base on balls; SO = Strikeouts; AVG = Batting average; SB = Stolen bases

Pitching 
Note: W = Wins; L = Losses; ERA = Earned run average; G = Games pitched; GS = Games started; SV = Saves; IP = Innings pitched; H = Hits allowed; R = Runs allowed; ER = Earned runs allowed; HR = Home runs allowed; BB = Walks allowed; K = Strikeouts

Farm system

References

External links 
 1950 Chicago White Sox at Baseball Reference
 1950 Chicago White Sox at Baseball Almanac

Chicago White Sox seasons
Chicago White Sox season
Chicago White